Travelin' is the eighth studio album by the pop rock band Tommy James and the Shondells released in 1970.

The album had two singles that charted. "She" went to #23 on the Billboard Hot 100 in January 1970.  "Gotta Get Back to You" reached #45 on the chart in March 1970. The album landed on the Billboard 200, reaching #91.

The album was the final album released by the band on Roulette Records.

Track listing
All songs written and composed by Tommy James and Bob King except where noted.

Credits
Acoustic and Electric Guitar: Eddie Gray
Acoustic and Electric Guitar and Keyboards: Tommy James
Keyboards: Ron Rosman
Bass: Mike Vale
Drums and Percussion: Peter Lucia
Producer: Bob King, Tommy James
Arranger: Bob King, Jimmy Wisner
Engineer: Bruce Staples

Charts
Album

Singles

References

1970 albums
Tommy James and the Shondells albums
Roulette Records albums